The following is a list of stations found within the Shijiazhuang Metro

Line 1

Line 2

Line 3

References

Stations
Shijiazhuang
Shijiazhuang